Qiu Zihan (born 17 January 1991) is a Chinese badminton player who is a doubles specialist. He was part of China winning team at the 2013 Sudirman Cup. Teamed-up with Liu Xiaolong, he won the 2013 All England Open and a silver medal at the 2015 World Championships. He also won the mixed doubles bronze medal at the 2010 Asian Championships partnered with Tian Qing.

Achievements

BWF World Championships 
Men's doubles

Asian Championships 
Mixed doubles

BWF World Junior Championships 
Boys' doubles

Asian Junior Championships 
Boys' doubles

Mixed doubles

BWF Superseries 
The BWF Superseries, which was launched on 14 December 2006 and implemented in 2007, was a series of elite badminton tournaments, sanctioned by the Badminton World Federation (BWF). BWF Superseries levels were Superseries and Superseries Premier. A season of Superseries consisted of twelve tournaments around the world that had been introduced since 2011. Successful players were invited to the Superseries Finals, which were held at the end of each year.

Men's doubles

Mixed doubles

  BWF Superseries Finals tournament
  BWF Superseries Premier tournament
  BWF Superseries tournament

BWF Grand Prix 
The BWF Grand Prix had two levels, the Grand Prix and Grand Prix Gold. It was a series of badminton tournaments sanctioned by the Badminton World Federation (BWF) and played between 2007 and 2017.

Men's doubles

  BWF Grand Prix Gold tournament
  BWF Grand Prix tournament

Record Against Selected Opponents 
Men's doubles results with Liu Xiaolong against Super Series finalists, Worlds Semi-finalists, and Olympic quarterfinalists.

  Chai Biao & Guo Zhendong 0–2
  Cai Yun & Fu Haifeng 0–1
  Chai Biao & Hong Wei 0–1
  Fu Haifeng & Zhang Nan 0–2
  Fang Chieh-min & Lee Sheng-mu 3–3
  Lee Sheng-mu & Tsai Chia-hsin 1–2
  Mathias Boe & Carsten Mogensen 5–2
  Mads Conrad-Petersen & Jonas Rasmussen 0–1
  Angga Pratama & Ryan Agung Saputra 1–3
  Muhammad Ahsan & Bona Septano 1–5
  Muhammad Ahsan & Hendra Setiawan 2–1
  Gideon Markus Fernaldi & Markis Kido 2–1
  Hirokatsu Hashimoto & Noriyasu Hirata 4–2
  Hiroyuki Endo & Kenichi Hayakawa 4–3
  Jung Jae-sung & Lee Yong-dae 0–4
  Ko Sung-hyun & Lee Yong-dae 3–3
  Ko Sung-hyun & Yoo Yeon-seong 0–3
  Lee Yong-dae & Yoo Yeon-seong 0–2
  Mohd Zakry Abdul Latif & Mohd Fairuzizuan Mohd Tazari 2–0
  Koo Kien Keat & Tan Boon Heong 0–6
  Hoon Thien How & Tan Wee Kiong 1–1
  Goh V Shem & Lim Khim Wah 1–0
  Bodin Isara & Maneepong Jongjit 1–1

References 

1991 births
Living people
Sportspeople from Jinan
Badminton players from Shandong
Chinese male badminton players
Asian Games medalists in badminton
Asian Games silver medalists for China
Badminton players at the 2014 Asian Games
Medalists at the 2014 Asian Games